Edenred, formerly known as Accor Services, is an international company that specialises in specific-purpose payment solutions for companies, employees and merchants. Edenred is the inventor of Ticket Restaurant, created in 1962.

The company provides services including employee benefits, meal vouchers, loyalty programs, fleet and mobility and corporate payment. Edenred operates in 46 countries, employs 10,000 people and serve 50 million employees users worldwide.

History
Inspired by the original Luncheon Voucher, a concept launched in the United Kingdom in 1954, Jacques Borel created Ticket Restaurant on the French market in 1962. A French government decree, passed in 1967, officially recognized the meal voucher as an employee benefit. The concept was launched outside France starting in 1976. Ticket Restaurant and its local variant Ticket Alimentación began spreading to other countries in Europe and Latin America, including Brazil and Mexico.

The Ticket Restaurant entity, which had been a subsidiary of the Accor Group since 1983, became Accor Services in 1998. In the 2000s, Edenred launched new offerings such as Incentive and Reward programs, with Kadéos in Europe, and Fleet & Mobility solutions with the development of Ticket Car in Latin America.

In September 2007 Accor Services acquired a 98.3% stake UK pioneer and market leader in prepaid cards, PrePay Technologies Ltd, for €55M.

Following the split of Accor's hotel and prepaid services businesses, Accor Services became Edenred in June 2010. The group was listed on NYSE Euronext Paris on July 2, 2010. Jacques Stern was appointed chairman and chief executive officer.

Edenred also launched the Ticket Plus Card in Germany (staple goods: food, fuel, meals), Ticket Cultura in Brazil (cultural goods and services), and Fides Cloud Loyalty Software in India, managed by its subsidiary Accentiv India Pvt. Ltd.

In 2014, Edenred acquired C3, a leader in the employee payroll cards market in the United Arab Emirates. The Group also acquired 34% of UTA, Europe’s second largest fuel card issuer, before increasing its stake to 51% in January 2017,  to 66% in 2018 and 100% in 2020.

Bertrand Dumazy became Chairman and Chief Executive Officer of Edenred on October 26, 2015.

The group shifted focus to digital products and launched the Ticket Restaurant card in France in April 2014. As of 2021, 90% of the group's business volume around the world was generated from digital products.

In 2016, the Group began a far-reaching transformation as part of its Fast Forward strategic plan (2016-2019). Also in the year, Edenred launched its Corporate Payment Services business and acquired Embratec's operations in Brazil.

In November 2018, Edenred announced the acquisition of Corporate Spending Innovations, an electronic B2B payments company, for $600 million.

Ownership
According to the company website: 94.5% institutional investors, 5.1% individual shareholders, 0.4% own shares.

Expansion

Edenred operates in 46 countries and has over 10,000 employees. The group has moved into new countries since 2010: Finland in 2011, Japan in 2012, Russia, the United Arab Emirates in 2014 and Moldova in 2018.

Challenge to Public Procurement in the UK
In 2014, Edenred initiated a high court case in which it argued that the UK Treasury was in breach of EU public procurement law in varying a contract with Atos IT Services Ltd to take account of changes in tax-free childcare law, without initiating a new procurement process. Their case was taken to the Supreme Court in 2015 but Edenred were unsuccessful, the court ruling that the modifications made to Atos' contract were not "substantial".

References

Footnotes

Citations

External links

French companies established in 2010
Companies based in Paris
Companies listed on Euronext Paris